Balto-Finnic may refer to:

Balto-Finnic peoples
Balto-Finnic languages

Language and nationality disambiguation pages